( Combination meals) is a Spanish prime-time Galician language television sitcom which was broadcast on Televisión de Galicia form 1 December 1995 to 24 May 2006. It was the first sitcom developed entirely by Galician professionals and starring Galician actors.

Created by Xosé Cermeño, it was produced by Television de Galicia (TVG) and Editorial Compostela for fourteen seasons with 261 episodes in total.

Plot
Married couple Miro Pereira and Balbina Santos run a bar named "Café Suizo" in a small Galician town after coming back from living in Switzerland. Miro, who is a greedy, lazy, not very clean, whiner and clumsy man, continually devises plans together with his brother-in-law Antón to go hunting, fishing, earn easy money or work even less than the little he does, which never turn out as expected.

Cast

Episodes

Accolades

References

External links 
  
 

1995 Spanish television series debuts
2006 Spanish television series endings
1990s Spanish comedy television series
2000s Spanish comedy television series
Galician-language television shows
Television shows set in Galicia (Spain)